Hammer an der Uecker is a municipality in the Vorpommern-Greifswald district, in Mecklenburg-Vorpommern, Germany.  The eponymous Uecker is a proximate river.

References

Vorpommern-Greifswald